Oxynoemacheilus seyhanensis, the Samanti loach, is a species of ray-finned fish in the family Nemacheilidae.
It is found only in Turkey.
Its natural habitat is rivers.
It is threatened by habitat loss.

References

seyhanensis
Endemic fauna of Turkey
Fish described in 1968
Taxa named by Petre Mihai Bănărescu
Taxonomy articles created by Polbot